Kyshona Annika Knight (born 19 February 1992) is a Barbadian cricketer who plays for Barbados, Trinbago Knight Riders and the West Indies as a left-handed batter. Her twin sister, Kycia, also plays for Barbados and the West Indies.

In October 2021, she was named in the West Indies team for the 2021 Women's Cricket World Cup Qualifier tournament in Zimbabwe. In July 2022, she was named in the Barbados team for the cricket tournament at the 2022 Commonwealth Games in Birmingham, England.

References

External links

1992 births
Barbadian women cricketers
Living people
West Indies women One Day International cricketers
West Indies women Twenty20 International cricketers
West Indian women cricketers
Trinbago Knight Riders (WCPL) cricketers
Twin sportspeople
Cricketers at the 2022 Commonwealth Games
Commonwealth Games competitors for Barbados
Barbados women Twenty20 International cricketers